is a former Japanese football player.

Club statistics

References

External links

1981 births
Living people
Kwansei Gakuin University alumni
Association football people from Hyōgo Prefecture
Japanese footballers
J1 League players
J2 League players
Japan Football League players
Vissel Kobe players
Kataller Toyama players
Fagiano Okayama players
Association football forwards